Qeshlaq-e Beyg Ali-ye Vosta (also Romanized as Qeshlāq-e Beyg ʿAlī-ye Vosţá) is a village in Qeshlaq-e Sharqi Rural District, Qeshlaq Dasht District, Bileh Savar County, Ardabil Province, Iran. At the 2006 census, its population was 42, in 7 families.

References 

Towns and villages in Bileh Savar County